Stefan Machaj (born 29 September 1964) is a retired Polish football defender.

References

1964 births
Living people
Polish footballers
Śląsk Wrocław players
Zagłębie Lubin players
Pogoń Szczecin players
Hapoel Jerusalem F.C. players
Odra Opole players
Association football defenders
Polish expatriate footballers
Expatriate footballers in Israel
Polish expatriate sportspeople in Israel
People from Głogów